Hans Acker (c. 1380 – 1461, Ulm) was a German stained glass artist. Members of his family also practiced the art, including Jacob Acker the Younger and Jacob the Elder.  He is best known for a series of six stained glass windows, dating to the 1430s, in the Ulm Münster Lutheran church, each illustrating numerous scenes of the Bible.

External links 
 

1380s births
1461 deaths
German stained glass artists and manufacturers
15th-century German artists
People from Ulm